The ranks and insignia of the Sri Lanka Air Force are the military insignia used by the Sri Lanka Air Force. Upon the formation of the Sri Lanka Air Force in 1951, rank titles and badges for ORs were adopted from the Royal Air Force officer ranks and other ranks. Sri Lanka does have an Air Chief Marshal rank, but it is only awarded to the Chief of Defence Staff (CDS) or as an honorary rank; Air Chief Marshal Roshan Goonetileke was the only Sri Lankan Air Force officer to hold the air chief marshal rank while in active service.

Commissioned officer ranks
The rank insignia of commissioned officers.

Other ranks
The rank insignia of non-commissioned officers and enlisted personnel.

See also 
 Sri Lanka Armed Forces
 Sri Lanka Army ranks and insignia
 Sri Lanka Navy ranks and insignia

References

External links 

 Sri Lanka Air Force
 Ministry of Defence, Public Security, Law & Order - Democratic Socialist Republic of Sri Lanka

Sri Lanka Air Force
 Air Force
Ranks and insignia